Hordubalové is a Czech drama film directed by Martin Frič. It was released in 1937. It was based on the novel Hordubal by Karel Čapek.

Cast
 Jaroslav Vojta - Juraj Hordubal
 Suzanne Marwille - Polana Hordubalová
 Paľo Bielik - Michal Hordubal
 Mirko Eliáš - Stepán Manya
 Vlasta Součková - Maryna Hordubalová
 Eliška Kuchařová - Hafie Hordubalová
 František Kovařík - Míso - Chief shepherd
 Filip Davidik - Filípek
 Gustav Hilmar - Gelnaj
 Vilém Pfeiffer - Karel Biegel
 Vladimír Majer - Gejza Fedeles
 Alois Dvorský - MUDr. Václav Klenka

References

External links
 

1937 films
1937 drama films
1930s Czech-language films
Czechoslovak black-and-white films
Films directed by Martin Frič
Czechoslovak drama films
Adaptations of works by Karel Čapek
1930s Czech films